Russell E. Hart (1872 - June 11, 1955) was an American architect. He designed or restored many buildings in Tennessee, including the Tennessee Governor's Mansion and the Parthenon.

Life
Hart was born in 1872 in Darlington, South Carolina. He graduated from Furman University in 1895. He studied Gothic Revival architecture in Paris, France, and he was trained by Noland and Baskervill in Richmond, Virginia and Cram, Goodhue & Ferguson in New York City.

Hart became an architect in Nashville, Tennessee in 1910. He designed the Tennessee Governor's Mansion in 1929. He restored the Parthenon in Centennial Park, originally designed by William Crawford Smith in 1897. He was a partner in Hart, Freeland & Roberts from 1947 to his death, and he was a member of the American Institute of Architects.

Hart resided at 212 Jackson Boulevard in Belle Meade, Tennessee with his wife, née Elizabeth Douthit, and their son, Maxwell Hart. He was a 33rd Degree Mason. He died on June 11, 1955 in Nashville, Tennessee, at the age of 82, and he was buried in Darlington, South Carolina.

References

1872 births
1955 deaths
People from Darlington, South Carolina
People from Belle Meade, Tennessee
Architects from Tennessee
20th-century American architects
American Freemasons